The 1929 Tour de Hongrie was the fourth edition of the Tour de Hongrie cycle race and was held from 27 to 30 June 1929. The race started and finished in Budapest. The race was won by Oskar Thierbach.

Route

General classification

References

1929
Tour de Hongrie
Tour de Hongrie